Bevin Glacier is a glacier  long, which flows east from the plateau escarpment on the east side of Graham Land into the northwest end of Cabinet Inlet between Attlee Glacier and Anderson Glacier. During December 1947 it was charted by the Falkland Islands Dependencies Survey (FIDS) and photographed from the air by the Ronne Antarctic Research Expedition. It was named by the FIDS for Rt. Hon. Ernest Bevin, M.P., British Minister of Labour and National Service and member of the War Cabinet.

See also
 List of glaciers in the Antarctic
 Glaciology

References 

Glaciers of Graham Land
Foyn Coast